Armenia–Australia relations are bilateral relations between Armenia and Australia. Australia's accredited mission to Armenia is from its embassy in Moscow.

History
Armenia and Australia officially established relations in 1992, and the two countries since then have developed a fairly friendly relationship.

Armenian diaspora in Australia

While Armenia and Australia only established relations in 1992, Armenians first appeared in Australia in 1850s (Armenians were either known as Turks, Persians or Russians), but only became relevant when the Armenian genocide occurred. The Armenian genocide happened on the same day as the Entente decided to launch the Gallipoli Campaign against the Ottoman Empire with hope to finish the war quickly, but unsuccessful. Nonetheless, Australian troops frequently contacted the Armenians being deported and starved by the Ottoman Turkish authorities in the Middle East, and developed a sense of sympathy to the Armenian victims. Armenians were granted refugee status to settle in Australia following the WWI, but the migration only reached peak when the World War II began when Armenia was under Soviet occupation, upheavals in Iran, Iraq and Syria, and later the First Nagorno-Karabakh War.

Armenian community in Australia has a strong connection to Armenia, and has frequently clashed with the Turkish and Azerbaijani diaspora population over the Karabakh conflict.

Armenian genocide

Australia has not recognized the Armenian genocide due to its relations with Turkey. However, Armenia and Australia have a connection throughout the World War I, when Australia as part of the British Empire fought against the Ottomans the same day as the Armenian genocide began. The importance, for both nations, are known: for Armenians, it was a quest of survival from the oppression, while for Australians, it was a watershed moment fomenting a common Australian identity. Frequent contact with Armenian deportees had forged a sense of solidarity, Australian troops had assisted relief efforts to Armenian deportees and in March 1918, Australian Colonel Stanley Savige made a brave defending against the Ottoman force routing the Armenian and Assyrian genocide victims, saving the lives of many Armenians and Assyrians. An Australia-run orphanage was established in Antelias, Lebanon to provide aids for Armenian orphans.

Although Australia has yet to recognize the genocide, Armenian genocide is mentioned thanks for efforts by Armenian scholar Vicken Babkenian and his Australian counterpart Peter Stanley, but it gained more relevance, in particular owning by Recep Tayyip Erdoğan's increasing hostility and anti-Australian remarks in recent years, most notably his blaming against Australia over Christchurch mosque shootings in 2019.

Australia has endorsed a solution to recognize the Armenian genocide in 2018.

Economic relations
The total value of imports from Australia during 2014–18 period was approximately US$23 million while the total value of exports was approximately US$697,000. The peak year for imports into Armenia from Australia was 2014, which was approximately US$9 million, while the peak year for exports from Armenia into Australia was 2016, which was US$214,000; thus expectation of economic boosting has increased despite negligence on relations.

See also
Foreign relations of Armenia
Foreign relations of Australia
Armenian Australians

References

External links
Australian Embassy, Russian Federation (Armenia, Belarus, Kazakhstan, Kyrgyz Republic, Tajikistan, Turkmenistan, Uzbekistan)

 
Armenia
Australia